Maquinarama is the fifth studio album released by Skank, in 2000.

With Maquinarama, Skank began to move away from the reggae-tinged "party music" that had been a staple of the band for the first four albums. The album sold 350,000 copies.

The song "Balada do Amor Inabalável" was also put to soundtrack album of famous Brazilian soap opera Laços de Família (The family ties).

Track listing 

 "Água e Fogo" (Samuel Rosa/Chico Amaral/Edgard Scandurra)
 "Três Lados" (Samuel Rosa/Chico Amaral)
 "Ela Desapareceu" (Samuel Rosa/Chico Amaral)
 "Balada do Amor Inabalável" (Samuel Rosa/Fausto Fawcett)
 "Canção Noturna" (Lelo Zaneti/Chico Amaral)
 "Muçulmano" (Samuel Rosa/Rodrigo F. Leão)
 "Maquinarama" (Samuel Rosa/Chico Amaral)
 "Rebelião" (Samuel Rosa/Chico Amaral)
 "A Última Guerra" (Samuel Rosa/Lô Borges/Rodrigo F. Leão)
 "Fica" (Samuel Rosa/Chico Amaral)
 "Ali" (Samuel Rosa/Nando Reis)
 "Preto Damião" (Samuel Rosa/Chico Amaral)

Personnel 
Skank
 Samuel Rosa - vocals, acoustic and electric guitars
 Henrique Portugal - keyboards
 Haroldo Ferretti - drums
 Lelo Zaneti - bass

Additional musicians
 Chico Amaral - flute on "Maquinarama"
 Tom Capone - bass on "Rebelião"
 Andreas Kisser - guitar on "Rebelião"
 Marcelo Lobato - vibraphone on "Água e Fogo", "Balada do Amor Inabalável" and cuíca on "Preto Damião"
 Ramiro Musotto - percussion on "Balada do Amor Inabalável", "Canção Noturna", "Maquinarama" and "Rebelião"
 Décio Ramos, Paulo Santos - percussion on "Muçulmano", "A Última Guerra" and "Fica"

Production
 Chico Neves - production  (all, except 2, 5, 8, 11), recording
 Tom Capone - production  (tracks 2, 5, 8 and 11)
 Mauro Manzolli - co-producer, mixing on tracks 2, 5, 8 and 11
 Florência Saravia - recording assistant
 Jacquie Turner - mixing  (all, except 2, 5, 8, 11)
 Brandon Mason - mixing assistant
 Álvaro Alencar, Tom Capone - mixing: Estúdios Mega
 Bob Ludwig - mastering
 Frederico Toledo, Roberto Calixto - studio assistants: Estúdio Ferretti
 Guthenberg Pereira - studio assistant: Estúdio Mega
 Tomás Baptista - studio assistant: Toca do Bandido
 Bruno Ferretti - technician assistant

Design
 Kenny Scharf - artwork: Cadillac 1961 
 Angelo Paulino, Fernando Furtado, Luiz Ferreira, Weber Pádua - artwork: booklet
 Marcus Barão - artwork: graphic project
 Carla Framback - graphic project

References 

2000 albums
Skank (band) albums